AsiaSat 8 then AMOS-7 is a Hong Kong-turned-Israeli geostationary communications satellite which is operated by the Asia Satellite Telecommunications Company (Asiasat).

Satellite description 
AsiaSat 8 was built by Space Systems/Loral, and is based on the LS-1300 satellite bus. The satellite carries twenty-four Ku-band transponders and one Ka-band payload, and was planned to be initially positioned above the equator, at a longitude of 105.5° East, providing coverage of southern and south-eastern Asia, China and the Middle East.

Launch 
SpaceX was contracted to launch AsiaSat 8, using a Falcon 9 v1.1 launch vehicle. The launch took place from Space Launch Complex 40 (SLC-40) at the 
Cape Canaveral Air Force Station (CCAFS) on 5 August 2014 at 08:00 UTC.

Falcon 9 upper stage 

AMOS-7 
In December 2016, Spacecom made a US$88 million four-year agreement with AsiaSat to lease AsiaSat 8 Ku-band. It is providing service at 4° West.

See also 

 List of Falcon 9 launches

References

External links 
 

Spacecraft launched in 2014
AsiaSat satellites
SpaceX commercial payloads
Satellites using the SSL 1300 bus
Satellite television
Communications satellites of Israel
Communications satellites in geostationary orbit